Ajgaibibi is a Hindu goddess and folk deity in Bengal. She was probably worshipped as a member of a seven-goddess group, as attested by a prehistoric terracotta artifact found at Mohenjodaro consisting of Ajgaibibi, Oladevi, Jholabibi, Chandbibi, Bahadabibi, Jhetunebibi and Asanbibi.

Notes

Hinduism in Bangladesh